Urshan College, formerly known as Gateway College of Evangelism, is a Christian College in Wentzville, Missouri, near St. Louis. It is owned and operated by the United Pentecostal Church International (UPCI). In 2012, the college was acquired by Urshan Graduate School of Theology.

History 
The founding of a Bible college in the St. Louis area was initiated by Harry Branding (superintendent of the Missouri District for the UPCI), who formed a committee to look into this possibility, this committee presented the idea to the Missouri District Board. On July 13, 1966, the district passed a resolution to create such a Bible college. The next year the bylaws were chosen and the college was given the name Gateway College of Evangelism.

On September 13, 1968, Gateway College officially opened at 3155 Charbonier Road in Florissant, Missouri. Three years later, the college purchased the former St. Stanislaus Seminary at 700 Howdershell Road.

After four decades, President Darrel Johns led the school through a transition to UPCI ownership. After many months of collaboration the UPCI General Board approved a plan for Urshan Graduate School of Theology to acquire Gateway College and start a new undergraduate Christian college. On July 1, 2012, the transition was complete. At this point, Urshan College began to be operated jointly with Urshan Graduate School of Theology under the governance of the Urshan Board of Directors and President David K. Bernard.

In January 2018, President David K. Bernard submitted his resignation as president of Urshan College and Urshan Graduate School of Theology. While the board of directors conducted a search for a new president for the Urshan System, Executive Vice President Jennie Russell served as interim president. In November 2018, the board of directors selected Dr. Brent Coltharp to serve as president effective January 2019, and Jennie Russell returned to her role as executive vice president.

Academics

Urshan College currently offers an associate's degree in General Studies and bachelor's degrees in Christian Ministry, Human Services, Organizational Leadership, Music, Worship Ministry, Communications Studies. Each of these degrees have concentration options as well. In Fall 2008, the college began offering online classes through the Consortium of Online Christian Colleges in addition to their on-campus instruction.

On July 6, 2018, the Higher Learning Commission (HLC) Board of Trustees granted Urshan College a status of "Candidate for Accreditation". On June 30, 2020, The HLC Board of Trustees granted Urshan College regional accreditation.

Enrollment

As of Fall 2018, the school reported an enrollment of 238 students (a 30% increase from Fall 2017). As of Fall 2016, the student body was 51% Male and 49% Female; 78% are Full-time and 22% are Part-time; 82% are on campus while 18% are distance learners; 62% are white or Caucasian, 22% are Hispanic, 4% are Black or African-American, 3% are two or more races, 9% unreported.

Location
Urshan is currently located in the northwestern part of the Saint Louis metropolitan area, near the population center of the United Pentecostal Church International. The college recently relocated from Florissant, Missouri, to Wentzville, Missouri, kicking off the 2019-2020 school year on the new campus. The campus, formerly a CenturyLink office complex, consists of five buildings sitting on 43 acres of land.

References

External links
Official website

Oneness Pentecostalism
Universities and colleges affiliated with the United Pentecostal Church International
Pentecostalism in Missouri
Pentecostal universities and colleges
Universities and colleges in St. Louis
Evangelical seminaries and theological colleges